The 1992–93 Esiliiga is the second season of the Esiliiga, second-highest Estonian league for association football clubs, since its establishment in 1992.

Final table

See also
 1992–93 Meistriliiga
 1992 in Estonian football
 1993 in Estonian football

References
RSSSF

Esiliiga seasons
2
2
Estonia